Manuel García Barzanallana García-Frías (17 August 1817, Madrid - 29 January 1892, Madrid) was a Spanish politician and government official who served as Ministro de Hacienda y Administraciones Públicas (now known as the Ministro de Economía, Industria y Competitividad) during the reign of Isabella II.

Biography 
His father was head of the Customs Office in Asturias. 
 He studied in several cities, ending at the University of Barcelona, where he graduated in 1840. After working for four years as a lawyer in Madrid, he became a civil servant in the Ministro de Hacienda and, in 1845, was promoted to Assistant Director in the Customs Office.

In 1846, he was elected to the Congress of Deputies on the Moderate Party ticket, representing Cangas de Tineo. Between then and 1865, he was returned to office several times, representing various constituencies.

In 1853, he became Director General of Customs and was appointed to his first term as Ministro de Haciendas in 1856. The following year, he became a member of the newly created Royal Academy of Moral and Political Sciences and later served as its President. He began his second term as Ministro de Haciendas in 1864 and, in 1866, was named a Senator for life. Later that same year, Queen Isabella awarded him the title "Marquès de Barzanallana".

Following the Bourbon Restoration, he represented Ovieda in the Senate as a member of the Conservative Party. In 1875, he was appointed President of the Council of State and participated in drafting the Constitution of 1876. From 1876 to 1882, he served as President of the Senate.

He was a Knight in the Order of the Golden Fleece and a recipient of the Order of Charles III.

References

Further reading
  La hacienda por sus ministros: la etapa liberal de 1845 a 1899,  Francisco Comín Comín, Rafael Vallejo Pousada and Pablo Martín Aceña (eds.) University of Zaragoza Press, 2006

External links

1817 births
1892 deaths
Economy and finance ministers of Spain
Knights of the Golden Fleece of Spain
People from Madrid
University of Barcelona alumni
Presidents of the Senate of Spain